The Thampis and Kochammas are the sons and daughters of the maharajahs of Travancore and their consorts belonging to Samanthan Nair caste 

Thampis and Thankachis form a part of the Nair caste and had no title of succession to the throne. The very term Thampi and Thankachi meant in Tamil language, brother and sister respectively which indicated the position of the Thampi families as the non-crown inheriting royal relatives of the Royal House of Travancore as per the matrilineal law followed.

The consort of the ruling Maharajah (King) as well as Elayarajah (Crown Prince) was known as the Ammachi with the title of Panapillai Amma. To the names of the sons of the Maharajahs was prefixed the title of Sri suffixed with Thampi. The daughters were known as Kochammas. The other members as well as the descendants of the Ammaveedus, however, were simply known as Thampi and Thankachi.

Origin
The Maharajahs of Travancore (current south Kerala and Kanyakumari district) adopted the matrilineal custom and inheritance prevalent in the land around the 14th Century AD. So basically, the Nair Thampi caste people originated at the original Travancore capital i.e. Padmanabhapuram in present day Kanyakumari district of Tamil Nadu. The Thampis present in the Northern Travancore Kingdom i.e present central Kerala districts like Thampis in Kottayam are people who have since migrated to northern borders of Kingdom after the 17th century.  Accordingly, when a king died, his nephew (sister's son) would become the next ruler, and his own son, born of his  wife, would be simply called Thampi with the title " Sri (mother's house name) (personal name) Thampi" which was also one of the highest titles of nobility in Travancore. All of the Maharajahs' daughters were known by the style of Kochamma with the title " (mother's house name) Ammaveetil Srimathi (personal name) Pilla Kochamma". Since the Marumakkathayam system of matrilineal inheritance existed in Travancore, the descendants of these individuals would not gain any distinguishing title other than Thampi (male) and Thankachi (female).

Position
The title of Thampi was also rarely given to some families in Travancore by the Maharajah of Travancore, as a reward for exemplary military, social or government services. Thampis indeed had some special social privileges in Travancore. Besides only the Maharajah, they were the only people permitted the use of Palanquins. They also had the right to visit their Royal Cousins, their father's heir as per the Marumakkathayam law, Without formally previously Announcing their visit. 

According to a noted expert, in some of the areas on the borders of Travancore and Cochin Kingdom, they formed the third estate colloquially called "Thoruvam Nairs". In the caste hierarchy, they belonged to the  Samanthan Nairs  subcaste.

See also
 Valiathan
 Irayimman Thampi
 Nair

References

Indian court titles
Titles in India
Nair
Travancore royal family
Women of the Kingdom of Travancore
People of the Kingdom of Travancore